Closing In on the Fire is an album by American country music artist Waylon Jennings, released on the small Ark 21 Records label on June 16, 1998. It features contributions from several celebrities associated with both country and rock music. The selections include, among others, Sting's "She's Too Good for Me" and Tony Joe White's title track, creating a greater degree of musical eclecticism than in many previous Jennings releases. The singer incorporated elements of genres such as blues and rock, in addition to traditional country ballads. "Best Friends of Mine", an autobiographical song, is a tribute to Buddy Holly, Hank Williams, Jr. and Jim Carchow (former DJ and longtime voice of the Idaho Falls Chukars) one of Jennings' close friends from his days in Phoenix. Carl Smith, one of the performer's idols, appears on "Untitled Waltz". In an interview, the singer mentioned that he wasn't fully satisfied with his take on The Rolling Stones' "No Expectations", calling it "a little more contrived than I would have liked". An interview featuring Jennings commenting on the record is included as a bonus track. Closing In on the Fire, Jennings' 72nd release, reached #71 on the country charts and was the last studio album by the singer to be released before his death in 2002.

Track listing 
 "Closing In on the Fire" (Tony Joe White)  – 4:41
 "I Know About Me Don't Know About You"  – 3:02
 With Travis Tritt
 "Best Friends of Mine" (Jennings)  – 3:57
 "Just Watch Your Mama and Me" (Jennings)  – 4:45
 With Jessi Colter
 "She's Too Good for Me" (Sting)  – 2:30
 With Sheryl Crow and Mark Knopfler
 "Back Home (Where I Come From)" (Jennings)  – 4:37
 "Be Mine" (Kimmie Rhodes)  – 4:41
 "Easy Money"  – 4:51
 "The Blues Don't Care"  – 6:08
 "Untitled Waltz" (Kevin Welch)  – 3:52
 With Carl Smith
 "No Expectations" (Mick Jagger, Keith Richards)  – 10:05
 Interview – 9:25

Personnel 
 Sam Bacco - percussion
 Richard Bennett - acoustic guitar, electric guitar
 Pat Buchanan - electric guitar
 Larry Byrom - acoustic guitar, electric guitar
 Jessi Colter - vocals
 Sheryl Crow - vocals
 Michael Henderson - acoustic guitar, electric guitar, mandolin, harmonica
 Jack Holder - electric guitar
 Mark Knopfler - electric guitar
 Bill Livsey - electric guitar, harmonium, accordion, Wurlitzer piano, Clavinet, Hammond B-3 organ
 Greg Morrow - drums
 Michael Rhodes - bass
 Carter Robinson - vocals
 Hargus "Pig" Robbins - piano
 Matt Rollings - piano
 Randy Scruggs - acoustic guitar
 Sting - bass
 Harry Stinson - percussion
 Marty Stuart - electric guitar, mandolin
 George Tidwell - trumpet
 Travis Tritt - vocals
 Robby Turner - steel guitar, resonator guitar
 Steve Turner - drums
 Waylon Jennings - vocals

Chart performance

References

External links 
 

Waylon Jennings albums
1998 albums